Whytockia is a genus of flowering plants belonging to the family Gesneriaceae.

Its native range is southern China and Taiwan.

Known species
As accepted by Plants of the World Online:

The genus name of Whytockia is in honour of James Whytock (1845–1926), an English gardener in Ireland and at various Scottish castles and estates. He was also president of the Scottish Horticultural Association and the Botanical Society of Edinburgh. 
It was first described and published in Trans. Bot. Soc. Edinburgh Vol.27 on page 338 in 1919.

References

Didymocarpoideae
Gesneriaceae genera
Plants described in 1919
Flora of Taiwan
Flora of South-Central China
Flora of Southeast China